The Monticello Hotel was an historic hotel built in 1898 on Monticello Avenue in Norfolk, Virginia. The original hotel was destroyed by a fire on New Year's Day in 1918, a day so cold that the water from the fire equipment froze before it could reach the fire. The hotel was rebuilt in 1919, with two additional stories added, and operated until it was demolished in 1976 as part of Norfolk's ongoing urban renewal project.

The Norfolk Federal Building currently sits on the old Monticello Hotel site.

Historical gallery

References

Buildings and structures in Norfolk, Virginia
Hotels in Virginia
Demolished hotels in the United States
Downtown Norfolk, Virginia
Buildings and structures demolished in 1976
Hotels established in 1898
Hotel buildings completed in 1898
1898 establishments in Virginia
Demolished buildings and structures in Virginia